Dales & District operates both local and regional bus services in County Durham and North Yorkshire, England. It is a subsidiary of Procters Coaches.

History 
The company was founded in 1998, with the original network centring around the market town of Northallerton and Wensleydale. 

In March 2006, following the closure of Arriva North East's depot in Richmond, the company agreed to take on the operation of most of the North Yorkshire County Council-supported services, as well as some staff. This saw significant expansion in operations across the region.

In 2012, a new depot was opened in Leeming Bar.

In April 2016, two of the bus services (31 & 74) operated by Dales & District were deemed commercially unviable, which led to North Yorkshire County Council taking over the routes.

The company operate a number of services, including service 73, which runs between Bedale and Northallerton, and Sunday-only DalesBus service 856, which operates between Hawes and Northallerton.

Fleet and operations

Depots
As of May 2022, the company operates from a single depot at Leeming Bar, Northallerton.

Vehicles
The fleet consists mainly of diesel-powered single-deck vehicles manufactured by Alexander Dennis and Optare.

References

External links

Procters Coaches (North Yorkshire) Limited on Companies House
Dales & District (Procters Coaches) website

Transport in North Yorkshire
Bus operators in North Yorkshire
Companies based in Hambleton District